Neptis kikuyuensis is a butterfly in the family Nymphalidae. It is found in Kenya (the Kikuyu Escarpment and the Aberdare Range) and Tanzania. The habitat consists of montane forests.

References

Butterflies described in 1951
kikuyuensis